Tràng Tiền Plaza is a shopping center located in the downtown of Hanoi, Vietnam. The complex's construction began on April 30, 2000 when Vietnamese people celebrated 25th anniversary of The liberation of the south of Vietnam. The complex was finished after 18 months of construction.

Organization
Trang Tien Plaza is the first and only luxury shopping center in Vietnam. Trang Tien Plaza has more than 200 fashion brands, cosmetics, handbags, footwear and accessories. There are over 50 leading international brands and most of the top 10 brands in the world fashion: Burberry, Cartier, Louis Vuitton, Rolex...Tràng Tiền Plaza offers more than 215,000 square feet (20,000 square meters) space for offices, retail shops, coffee and food outlets.
 First & Second  floor: Luxury brands
 Third floor: Cosmetics, Fine Jewelry and fashions
 Fourth floor: Men's Fashion, Leather, Sport, Women's Fashion and Lingerie
 Fifth floor: Fine dining and CGV Cinema
 Sixth floor: Kids and Home living

References

 Official Website
 Official Facebook

Buildings and structures in Hanoi
Tourist attractions in Hanoi
Retailing in Hanoi